The 2013 FIVB Volleyball Boys' U19 World Championship was held in Tijuana and Mexicali, Mexico, from 27 June to 7 July 2013. This was the first edition of the tournament that features 20 teams.

Competition formula
The 20 teams will be divided into four pools of five teams each and will play a round-robin tournament. The bottom-ranked team of each pool will play classification matches for 17th–20th place in a round-robin system.

The other 16 teams progress to the Eight Finals which consists of a playoff (1st of Pool A against 4th of Pool B etc.). The winners of the playoff matches will advance to the quarterfinals, semifinals and finals to be classified from 1st to 8th while the losers of playoff match will play classification matches, with a similar quarterfinals, semifinals and finals system, to be classified from 9th to 16th.

Qualification

Pools composition

Venues

Pool standing procedure
 Match points
 Number of matches won
 Sets ratio
 Points ratio
 Result of the last match between the tied teams

Match won 3–0 or 3–1: 3 match points for the winner, 0 match points for the loser
Match won 3–2: 2 match points for the winner, 1 match point for the loser

Preliminary round
All times are Pacific Daylight Time (UTC−07:00).

Pool A

|}

|}

Pool B

|}

|}

Pool C

|}

|}

Pool D

|}

|}

Final round
All times are Pacific Daylight Time (UTC−07:00).

17th–20th places

|}

|}

Final sixteen

Round of 16

|}

9th–16th quarterfinals

|}

Quarterfinals

|}

13th–16th semifinals

|}

9th–12th semifinals

|}

5th–8th semifinals

|}

Semifinals

|}

15th place match

|}

13th place match

|}

11th place match

|}

9th place match

|}

7th place match

|}

5th place match

|}

3rd place match

|}

Final

|}

Final standing

Awards

Most Valuable Player
 Pavel Pankov
Best Setter
 Matías Sánchez
Best Outside Spikers
 Dmitry Volkov
 Tang Chuanhang

Best Middle Blockers
 Maxim Troynin
 Zhang Zhejia
Best Opposite Spiker
 Victor Poletaev
Best Libero
 Rogério Carvalho

References

External links
Official website
Final Standing
Awards
Statistics

FIVB Volleyball Boys' U19 World Championship
World Youth Championship
FIVB Boys Youth World Championship
International volleyball competitions hosted by Mexico